Kalashnikova's House is an historic building in Pushkin, Saint Petersburg, Russia. Built in 1881, it is an object of cultural heritage. The building is located on 29/11 Malaya Street.

History 
In the 1820s,  two wooden buildings were construction on the future site of Kalashnikova's House. 

The plot was later bought by the widow of merchant Ekaterina Fedorovna Kalashnikova, who decided to build a new house to accommodate a hotel. The construction was conducted by the architect AP Goman. The hotel was called "North". 

In 1884, in the courtyard close to the neighboring house, architect P. P. Deineka built a two-story L-shaped stone wing. Both buildings were later occupied by the Pushkin Post Office, which was located there until modern times .

Architecture 
Since the main house is built on a small slope, then from the side of the street is a semi-basement. The house is decorated in the style of classicism, has a triangular pediment, under it a cornice with modulons and a frieze with stucco patterns in the form of wreaths. The first floor has a tape rust. 

Window openings adorn castle stones and sandricks. The design of the upper part of the building was seriously changed during the restoration of the building after World War II.

References

Literature

Sources 
 
 

Buildings and structures in Pushkin
1881 establishments in the Russian Empire
Neoclassical architecture in Russia
Cultural heritage monuments in Saint Petersburg